Small Town Sinners (German:Kleinstadtsünder) is a 1927 German silent film directed by Bruno Rahn and starring Asta Nielsen, Hermann Picha and Maria Paudler.

Cast
 Asta Nielsen as Selma Karchow 
 Hermann Picha as Meiseken  
 Maria Paudler as Hedwig, Tochter Rohdes  
 Hans Adalbert Schlettow as Wilhelm Bostelmann  
 Henry Bender as Ein Versicherungsagent  
 Hans Wassmann as August Karchow  
 Ferdinand von Alten as Arthur Canisius, Assessor 
 Max Maximilian as Rohde  
 Julietta Brandt as Ein Wandervogel 
 Bobbie Bender 
 Alexandra Schmitt 
 Emmy Wyda

References

Bibliography
 Eric Rentschler. German Film & Literature. Routledge, 2013.

External links

1927 films
Films of the Weimar Republic
Films directed by Bruno Rahn
German silent feature films
German films based on plays
German black-and-white films